New Directions may refer to:

Music
 New Directions (Jack DeJohnette album), 1978
 New Directions (The Meters album), 1977
 New Directions (Tavares album), 1982

Other uses
 New Directions Publishing, an American publishing company
 "New Directions" (Glee), a 2014 TV episode
 New Directions, the show choir that is the subject of the TV series Glee

See also
 
 
 New Direction (disambiguation)